El Carmen de Pijilí is a town and parish in  Camilo Ponce Enríquez Canton, Azuay Province, Ecuador. The parish covers an area of 180.9 km² and according to the 2001 Ecuadorian census it had a population total of 1,239.

References

Populated places in Azuay Province
Parishes of Ecuador